Long Forgotten Songs: B-Sides & Covers 2000–2013 is a compilation album by American punk rock band Rise Against, released on September 10, 2013. The album comprises twenty-six lesser known Rise Against songs, primarily B-sides, covers and different versions of already existing songs by the band. The idea for the album came about when the members of Rise Against attempted to catalog their lesser known material, but came to the conclusion that there were some songs that they did not own copies of. Long Forgotten Songs peaked at number nineteen on the Billboard 200, and charted in several other countries. The album received generally favorable reviews; several critics said the covers were the best aspect of the album, and noted how many of the songs felt fully fleshed out despite being relegated to B-sides.

Background and composition
While backstage at the 2013 Orion Music + More festival, the members of Rise Against attempted to catalog their lesser known B-sides and covers, but came to the conclusion that there were some songs that they did not own copies of. These songs were often included in Fat Music compilation albums or soundtrack albums. As lead singer Tim McIlrath put it: "If the four of us don't have these songs, who really does?" The band members thought that since there were enough lesser known songs to fill an entire album, it would be interesting to make a compilation album for these songs.

McIlrath described Long Forgotten Songs as "a trip down memory lane" for the band members and their fans. The album comprises twenty-six tracks that span nearly thirteen years, and includes various B-sides, covers, and different versions of existing Rise Against songs. Long Forgotten Songs is rooted in the band's signature hardcore punk and melodic hardcore sound, with lyrical themes ranging from relationships to politics. Among the album's covers include Bob Dylan's "Ballad of Hollis Brown", Journey's "Any Way You Want It", Nirvana's "Sliver", and Bruce Springsteen's "The Ghost of Tom Joad". The cover of "The Ghost of Tom Joad" in particular is a live recording from 2012, with MC5's Wayne Kramer, the Gaslight Anthem's Brian Fallon, and Rage Against the Machine's Tom Morello.

Some songs on Long Forgotten Songs were included as bonus tracks for previous Rise Against albums. For example, "Lanterns" was an iTunes bonus track for Endgame. Bassist Joe Principe explained how the song was a nod to the older sound of Rise Against, but its sound did not match the overall musical style of the album. He further explained that this was the reason why many of the songs on Long Forgotten Songs were chosen as B-sides; these songs did not fit the musical style or lyrical themes of the parent album.

Release and reception

Long Forgotten Songs was released on September 10, 2013. People who purchased the album from Best Buy received two additional cover tracks: "Fix Me" by Black Flag, and "Kick Out the Jams" by MC5. In the United States, the album debuted at number nineteen on the Billboard 200, and spent two weeks on the chart. Also in the United States, the album peaked at number four on the Top Alternative Albums chart, number two on the Top Hard Rock Albums chart, and number four on the Top Rock Albums. In the United Kingdom, Long Forgotten Songs reached number seventy-three on the Official Albums Chart and number seven on the Official Rock & Metal Albums Chart. Elsewhere, the album peaked at number sixteen in Australia, number seven in Austria, number four in Canada, number seven in Germany, number sixty-five in Scotland, and number thirty-three in Switzerland.

Long Forgotten Songs received generally favorable reviews. Revolver called the album "a surprisingly cohesive treasure trove", and highlighted the more unique cover songs such as "Little Boxes" and "The Ghost of Tom Joad".
AllMusic and Metal Hammer wrote that although most B-side compilation albums are usually hit-or-miss, Long Forgotten Songs had enough fully fleshed out songs to warrant a purchase. Both publications also praised the covers, with AllMusic commenting how the covers give the listener insight into the bands that influenced Rise Against's music. Kerrang! wrote: "This isn't just a bunch of orphan songs lassoed together as a cash in...it's as fan-pleasing as it is necessary, containing some of their best work to date".

Track listing

Charts

References

2013 compilation albums
Rise Against albums
Interscope Records compilation albums
B-side compilation albums